Attorney General Warren may refer to:

Earl Warren (1891–1974), Attorney General of California
Robert W. Warren (1925–1998), Attorney General of Wisconsin

See also
General Warren (disambiguation)